The Leeds North East byelection of 9 February 1956 was a by-election to the House of Commons. It was caused when the sitting Member, Osbert Peake, was awarded a Viscountcy in the New Year's Honours list (he took the title Viscount Ingleby). Sir Keith Joseph kept the seat for the Conservative Party with a slightly reduced numerical majority, but increased in percentage terms.

Candidates
The Conservative Party's choice of Sir Keith Joseph reflected his strong performance at the 1955 general election when he had failed to be elected, but only by 125 votes, in the London constituency of Baron's Court. Joseph was then a 37-year-old director of building and civil engineering companies and non-practising Barrister.

The Labour Party chose Harry Waterman, who had fought the constituency in the previous election. He was a 38-year-old local solicitor and a member of the Fabian Society. The election was a 'straight fight' with no Liberal or Independent candidate intervening.

Results
Sir Keith Joseph won with a majority of 5,869 on a turnout substantially down on the general election. He achieved a slight swing towards his party compared to 1955. He held the seat until he retired in 1987.

Votes

See also
 Leeds North East (UK Parliament constituency)
 List of United Kingdom by-elections (1950 - 1979)

References

"The Times House of Commons Supplement" Issued June 1957.

Leeds North East by-election
Leeds North East by-election
North East, 1956
North East by-election, 1956
Leeds North East by-election